The Jinnah class is a class of multi-role frigates planned for the Pakistan Navy. The class is being designed through the expertise gained by Pakistan under the Babur-class corvette (Pakistan Navy MILGEM design).

See also
 Ada-class corvette

References

Frigates of the Pakistan Navy
Frigate classes